Pineapple Street Studios (formerly Pineapple Street Media) is a podcast studio based in Brooklyn, New York. In August 2019, it was acquired by Entercom (now Audacy, Inc.). Pineapple's work includes multi-episode narratives, investigative journalism, branded podcasts, and talk shows. They've created series for companies like Nike, Hulu, Netflix, HBO, and The New York Times. In 2020, they led all podcast companies with two Peabody Award nominations, for The Catch and Kill Podcast with Ronan Farrow and Running From Cops. Twelve of their shows have reached #1 on Apple Podcasts.

History 
Pineapple Street Media was founded in 2016 by former BuzzFeed head of audio Jenna Weiss-Berman and Longform co-founder Max Linsky.

In August 2016, Pineapple released With Her, a commissioned podcast following Hillary Clinton's presidential campaign (the first to be hosted by a candidate for president). Max Linsky co-hosted.

In September 2016, in collaboration with The New York Times, Pineapple launched Still Processing, a culture podcast hosted by Jenna Wortham and Wesley Morris.

Pineapple teamed with filmmaker Dan Taberski on a series of investigative podcasts: Missing Richard Simmons, Surviving Y2K and Running from Cops. Missing Richard Simmons spent almost three weeks as the #1 series on Apple Podcasts. Vulture called it "brilliant" and "the strongest narrative podcast out there."

In 2017, they helped in the production of the podcast for Wormwood (miniseries) on Netflix. Errol Morris (the director) converses with multiple guests about the circumstances of Frank Olson's death and CIA involvement. Guests include: Jon Ronson (author of The Men Who Stare at Goats), Peter Sarsgaard (lead actor), Eric Olsen (son of Frank Olson).

In October 2018, it was announced that HBO Max greenlit a television adaptation of Pineapple and Stitcher's podcast, Heaven's Gate. Heaven's Gate: The Cult of Cults, a four-part documentary series, premiered on HBO Max on December 3, 2020.

Pineapple, in association with Gimlet Media, produced The Clearing, a docu-series about April Balascio and her father, serial killer Edward Wayne Edwards. It reached #1 on Apple Podcasts. The Guardian described the series as an "immense achievement." On December 18, 2019, Deadline announced that a television adaptation was in the works with Chernin Entertainment and Weimaraner Republic Pictures.

In partnership with investigative reporter Ronan Farrow, Pineapple debuted The Catch and Kill Podcast with Ronan Farrow, an audio companion to Farrow's bestselling book, Catch and Kill: Lies, Spies and a Conspiracy to Protect Predators. It won the 2020 Edward R Murrow Award for Best Podcast. Farrow also won a 2020 Webby People's Voice Award for Best Host.

With Crooked Media and Spotify, Pineapple produced Wind of Change. The series, hosted by writer and journalist Patrick Radden Keefe, was selected as one of the best podcasts of 2020 by The Guardian (#1 overall), The Atlantic, The New York Times, Rolling Stone and The New Yorker. Hulu is adapting the podcast for television with Alex Karpovsky signed on to write and executive produce. The podcast explored the theory that the 1990 Scorpion's song Wind of Change was Cold War propaganda, written by the CIA.

In August 2020, Pineapple launched Back Issue, a look at formative moments in pop culture, hosted by writer Tracy Clayton and Pineapple producer Josh Gwynn. On the series, The New York Times wrote, "Tracy Clayton and Josh Gwynn use their encyclopedic memory of pop culture moments as a balm in trying times." It was featured on Time and The Atlantic's lists of the best podcasts of 2020.

Shows

Original Podcasts

Podcasts for Brands and Editorial Partners

References 

Organizations established in 2016
Organizations based in Brooklyn
Podcasting companies
Audacy, Inc.
2019 mergers and acquisitions